Sulcospira collyra is a species of freshwater snail with an operculum, an aquatic gastropod mollusk in the family Pachychilidae.

The specific name collyra is from the Latin language. "Collyra" means elongated, because the shape of the shell is elongated.

Distribution 
This species occurs in Vietnam.

References

External links 

Pachychilidae
Gastropods described in 2009